Macdonald Critchley CBE (2 February 1900 – 15 October 1997) was a British neurologist. He was former president of the World Federation of Neurology, and the author of over 200 published articles on neurology and 20 books, including The Parietal Lobes (1953), Aphasiology, and biographies of James Parkinson and Sir William Gowers.

Biography
Macdonald Critchley was born at Bristol, son of gas collector Arthur Frank Critchley and Rosina Matilda (née White); he was educated in Bristol and received his medical degree there. His professional life centred on King's College Hospital and National Hospital for Paralysis and Epilepsy, Queen Square "for the Paralysed and Epileptic", London. He was a Registrar in 1927, and he was appointed to the staff as a physician in the following year and later became Dean of the Institute at Queen Square. His influence spread throughout the neurological world by teaching and writings and he later became President of the World Federation of Neurology.  He studied under Gordon Morgan Holmes, Samuel Alexander Kinnier Wilson and Francis Walshe.

During World War II he was a Consulting Neurologist in the Royal Navy Volunteer Reserve based at HMS Drake.

His contributions to knowledge depended not on technology, but on his power of observation and meticulous dissection of human sensibility and behaviour. The best known of his works were those on aphasia and the parietal lobes. Headache was also one of his many interests. He started a Headache Clinic at King's College Hospital and was one of the founders of the "British Migraine Trust". He delivered a paper at the "First Migraine Symposium" in 1966 on "Migraine: from Cappadocia to Queen Square", combining his clinical interest with his love of history. Critchley was a handsome and impressive figure, a superb speaker and a lifelong student of the human mind. His last book on the life and career of Hughlings Jackson, jointly with his wife Eileen, has been published posthumously.

He had married twice: firstly Edna Morris, with whom he had two sons (one of whom being the politician Julian Critchley) and secondly Eileen Hargreaves. He lived at Hughlings House (named in honour of John Hughlings Jackson), at Nether Stowey in Somerset.

In 2013 the weekly undergraduate teaching round at the National Hospital for Neurology and Neurosurgery at Queen Square was named after him - the Critchley Round.

Associated eponyms
 Adie-Critchley syndrome: A syndrome of forced grasping and groping.
  Klein-Levine- Critchley syndrome: A syndrome of hypersoomnia and hyperphagia.
 Levine-Critchley syndrome: Acanthocytosis Neuroacanthocytosis with neurologic disorders detailed by Edmund Critchley not Macdonald Critchley).

Bibliography
 The Parietal Lobes. London, Edward Arnold, 1953
 The Enigma of Gerstmann's Syndrome. Oxford, Brain, 1966
 Music and the Brain: Studies in the Neurology of Music (with R.A.Henson). London, Heinemann, 1977
 John Hughlings Jackson, Father of English Neurology (with Eileen A. Critchley). London, 1998

References

External links
 Documents relating to Critchley in the Queen Square Archive

1900 births
1997 deaths
British neurologists
Commanders of the Order of the British Empire
Royal Naval Volunteer Reserve personnel of World War II
20th-century British medical doctors